The Chagodoshcha (also known as Chagoda) is a river in Boksitogorsky District of Leningrad Oblast and in  Chagodoshchensky, Babayevsky, and Ustyuzhensky Districts of Vologda Oblast in Russia. It is a left tributary of the Mologa. The principal tributaries are the Lid (left), the Pes (right), and the Vnina (left).

The source of Chagodoshcha lies in the southeast of Leningrad Oblast, south of the town of Pikalyovo. The river flows in the general direction southeast and enters Vologda Oblast, where it accepts the Goryun from the left. In Vologda Oblast, the Chagodoshcha turns east and accepts the Lid from the left, and, right upstream from the settlement of Chagoda, the Pes from the right. The urban-type settlement of Chagoda is located on both banks of the Chagodoshcha. The river crosses Chagodoshchensky District from the west to the east, and subsequently runs at the border between Babayevsky (north) and Ustyuzhensky (south) Districts, turns northeast and enters Babayevsky District where it accepts the Vnina from the left. It then turns southeast and enters Ustyuzhensky District. The mouth of the Chagodoshcha is in the settlement of Imeni Zhelyabova.

The river basin of the Chagodoshcha comprises the eastern part of Boksitogorsky District of Leningrad Oblast, the northeastern part of Khvoyninsky District of Novgorod Oblast, as well as the whole area of Chagodoshchensky District, the south of Babayevsky District, and minor areas in Ustyuzhensky District, all of Vologda Oblast. 

Both Chagodoshchensky District and its center, the urban-type settlement of Chagoda, are named after the river.

A big portion of the lower course of the Chagodoshcha, downstream of the mouth of the Goryun River, belongs to Tikhvinskaya water system, one of the waterways constructed in the early 19th century to connect the river basins of the Volga and the Neva. Currently, it is not used for any commercial navigation.

References

External links

Rivers of Vologda Oblast
Rivers of Leningrad Oblast